Uçarı may refer to the following places in Turkey:

 Ucarı, Acıpayam
 Uçarı, Anamur, a village in Anamur district of Mersin Province
 Uçarı, Kazan, a village and neighborhood in the district of Kazan, Ankara Province